XULY.Bët Funkin' Fashion Factory, or XULY.Bët, is a clothing line designed by Lamine Badian Kouyaté, born 28 Dec 1962, a Malian / Senegalese fashion designer.

Lamine Badian Kouyaté was awarded "Creator of the Year" by The New York Times in 1994 and received the ANDAM Fashion Award in 1996. Some of his clothes were also a part of the "Africa 2005" exhibition at the Victoria and Albert Museum. In 2018, he was part of the exhibition "African Metropolis" at the MAXXI Museo in Rome.

With an impactful African heritage, XULY.Bët is best known for its use of recycled fabrics and clothing creating high fashion. It uses dead-stock fabrics but also reshapes found garments by cutting, printing and stitching ; making modifications that range from the subtle shaping to the complete transformation of the clothing function.

Having started upcycling clothing in the early 1990s, Lamine Kouyaté often tells the story of his mother and grandmother who would always use existing clothes to reshape them for him and his brothers. In that scenario, upcycling is something living deep in his cultural and familial roots, a very African concept of creating and avoiding waste.

His energetic style is often recognized by the red threads left hanging at the end of stitching. Their red color emphasizing the process of transformation from discarded garment to designer statement, also representing the color of blood, which unites all humanity, no matter the race, gender, sexual orientation...

The XULY.Bët style is the reflection of Kouyaté's roots and life. A diverse universe mixing textures, cultures, colors and ideas, enclosing contemporary urban Africa as well as the fashion worlds of Paris and New York. His clothes are a bold mix of electric prints and minimal sensual lines.

The designer's personal background, as well as his work, drew substantial attention from both the fashion and popular press. They've been featured in prominent publications such as Vogue Italia, I.D, Glamour, The New York Times, Le Figaro or Essence. Lamine Kouyaté's clothing and personality also played an important role in Robert Altman's film Ready-to-Wear (1994) in which he was portrayed by Forest Whitaker.

In 1995, he collaborated with Puma and became the first label to create a crossover collection in collaboration with a sports brand. He then led the way by working later on collections with APC, Absolut Vodka, Naf Naf, les 3 Suisses, Leclerc...

Soon after Lamine Kouyaté's beginnings, actresses and artists began wearing XULY.Bët. From Neneh Cherry, Rossy de Palma, Lisa Bonet to Grace Jones, Cardi B or Halle Berry, his designs have outlived the decades by being worn by them.

In the early 2010s, Lamine Kouyaté preferred the energy of New York and migrated his collections there to be an active partner of the New York Fashion Week from 2009 to 2018. In 2019, he decided to join forces with young CEO Rodrigo Martinez and moved the brand back to its native city: Paris. He was soon asked by Lucien Pagès to join his PR showroom and started showing his collections in the French capital again. His Fall-Winter 2020/2021 received tremendously good press 

Ever since the creation of XULY.Bët and in alignment with his ecological beliefs, Kouyaté prefers marketing his collections on a more sustainable scale. The future lies in his use of recycled fabrics and carefully chosen collaborations sharing the same eco-conscious ethics as he does.

Lamine Badian Kouyaté 
 
Born in Bamako on 28 December 1962, his father, Seydou Badian Kouyaté, was very important writer and politician who changed the face of Mali and was a notable defender of African rights. His mother, Dr Henriette Kouyaté Carvalho d’Alvarengo became the first Malian woman to obtain a doctor's licence in 1975. She spent her life fighting against genital mutilation and made sure the Malian government would realize what a terrible issue it was for women from all over the world.

Lamine Kouyaté moved from his native Bamako, Mali to France around 1986. He then started studying architecture at the École Nationale Supérieure d'Architecture de Strasbourg. Soon after, he realized his passion laid somewhere else. Passionate about fashion (he often cites having been amazed and inspired his whole youth by Yves Saint Laurent, the first designer to have put black models on his runways such as Iman, Katoucha and Naomi Campbell), he rapidly turned to fabrics and textiles as a mean to express architecture. As he was working on the lightness of fabrics out of curiosity, XULY.Bët was born in the Hôpital Éphémère, a famous squat for artists and creatives in the north of Paris.

Kouyaté's eye for upcycling garments and incorporating African styles and eclectic sensibility is what made XULY.Bët an influential underground fashion label. By creating XULY.Bët, Lamine Kouyaté dedicated his life and work to delivering women an ultra-feminine style, using popular references and any inspiration he could find in his books, music but most of his inspirations came from urban life. He often looks at the work of designers Azzedine Alaïa, Yves Saint Laurent as an important advancement in fashion. His inspirations also come from punk rock, grunge and funk music for his funky designs.

Lamine Kouyaté spent most of his life in Paris, where his children live and the brand XULY.Bët grew at its best. In 2014, he moved to New York, preferring its energy at the time. Five year laters, he decided to move back to its hometown where XULY.Bët is now operating and where his atelier is located, in Ivry-sur-Seine a nearby suburb.

References

External links 
XULY.Bët official website
XULY.Bët Instagram
XULY.Bët Facebook
"Prince of Pieces". Amy M. Spindler, The New York Times. May 2, 1993.
"Revealing New Layers of African Fashion". Guy Trebay, The New York Times. February 14, 2009.
"Lamine Kouyaté - crear una marca sostenible es el único camino", Ana María Ferrer, La Moda en las Calles, June 13, 2019.
"Le retour en force de XULY.Bët", Alexandre Lanz, 360°, December 11, 2019.
"Superproductions, peluches vivantes, engagement féministe..." Caroline Rousseau, M le Monde, March 14, 2020.
"Fashion Week, jour 8: Deux salles, deux ambiances", Margaux Krehl, Vanity Fair, March 3, 2020.
"XULY.Bët FW20 Collection", Steff Yotka, Vogue, March 3, 2020.
"XULY.Bët : la marque pionnière du "recycling" est de retour!", Sophie Fontanel, Le Nouvel Obs, March 23, 2020.

Malian fashion designers
People from Bamako
Malian emigrants to France